Ann is a variant of Anne, a female given name.

Ann may also refer to:

Places
 Ann, Missouri, historic town in the United States
Ann, Myanmar, town in Rakhine State
 Ann (crater), on the Moon
 Ånn, village in Jämtland, Sweden
 Abbotts Ann, formerly Ann or Anna, village and parish in Hampshire, England
 Ann Township, Rakhine State of Myanmar
 Cape Ann, Massachusetts, United States
 Cape Ann (Enderby Land), Antarctica
 Little Ann, hamlet in Hampshire, England

People with the surname
 Celeina Ann (born 1996), Japanese singer-songwriter
 Julia Ann (born 1969), American pornographic actress
 Keren Ann (born 1974), singer-songwriter, composer, producer and engineer
 Kerri Ann, stage name of Kerrie Ann Keogh (born 1977), Irish pop singer
 Lisa Ann, stage name of Lisa Ann Corpora, American pornographic actress
 Pam Ann, alter-ego of Australian comedian Caroline Reid
 Stevie Ann, stage name of Anna Stephanie Struijk (born 1986), Dutch singer-songwriter
 T. K. Ann (1912–2000), Hong Kong industrialist and sinologist
 Tina Ann, American singer

Music
Ann (singer), Taiwanese singer-songwriter
"Ann", a song by Dave Berry and the Cruisers, 1966
"Ann", a song by David Gates from First, 1973
"Ann", a song by The Meters from their eponymous debut album, 1969
"Ann" (The Stooges song), a song by The Stooges from The Stooges, 1969
"Ann", a song by Val Doonican, 1970
 "Miss Ann," a song by Little Richard from the album Here's Little Richard, 1957

Other uses
 , several ships
List of storms named Ann

See also
 ANN (disambiguation)
 Anna (disambiguation)
 Anne (disambiguation)
 Anni (disambiguation)
 Fort Ann (disambiguation)
 Lake Ann (disambiguation)